Yanama is a  mountain in the Vilcabamba Range in the Andes of Peru. It is located in the region of Cusco.

References 

Mountains of Peru
Mountains of Cusco Region